Ali Sa'ad Birnin-Kudu is a Muslim barrister and former governor of Jigawa State, northern Nigeria. He was a member of the now-defunct Social Democratic Party and served as governor from January 1992 until November 1993.

References

External links
Interview with birnin-Kudu

Living people
Year of birth missing (living people)
Governors of Jigawa State
Social Democratic Party (Nigeria) politicians
Nigerian Muslims